Stonebolt is a Canadian rock band from Vancouver. Their sound also included elements of pop and country.

History
The band first formed in 1969 under the name Perth Amboy. After adding a vocalist and keyboard player, they changed their name to Stonebolt in 1973. They performed in local Vancouver area venues for the next four years, and in 1976 they recorded five demos with producer Elliott Mazur at his San Francisco studio. In 1977, they signed a production contract with W. Stewart Productions, who in turn landed a recording contract with Parachute Records. The band released a self-titled album in 1978. A song from this album, "I Will Still Love You", became their first and highest-charting hit single (US #29, and #20 Easy Listening).  It did better in Canada, getting to #19 on singles charts after a slow, 17 week climb. A second single, "Love Struck" (U.S. #70), was released in 1979 and appeared on their second album. After Parachute went under, they signed with RCA Records, but further success eluded them. In 1999, Stonebolt re-recorded many of their songs for the CD compilation Regeneration: The Best of Stonebolt, as no original master tapes could be found.

Members
David Wills – lead and backing vocals
Ray Roper – guitar, backing and lead vocals
John Webster – keyboards
Dan Atchison – bass
Brian Lousley – drums, backing vocals
Lewis Nitikman – keyboards (replaced John Webster in 1981)

Album discography 
Stonebolt (Parachute Records, 1978)
Keep It Alive (RCA Records, 1979)
New Set of Changes (RCA Records, 1980)
Juvenile American Princess (RCA Records, 1982)
Regeneration: The Best of Stonebolt (Vortex Music, 1999)

References

External links
[ Stonebolt] at AllMusic
Canadian Classic Rock website
Entire Discography

Canadian rock music groups
Musical groups established in 1969
Musical groups from Vancouver
1969 establishments in British Columbia